Neurocordulia molesta, known generally as the smoky shadowdragon or Apalachicola shadowfly, is a species of emerald dragonfly in the family Corduliidae. It is found in North America.

The IUCN conservation status of Neurocordulia molesta is "LC", least concern, with no immediate threat to the species' survival.

References

Further reading

 

Corduliidae
Articles created by Qbugbot
Insects described in 1863